Craterellus caeruleofuscus is a species of fungus in the mushroom family Cantharellaceae.

External links
Index Fungorum

Cantharellales
Taxa named by Alexander H. Smith